Nikolay Kirillovich Maksyuta (26 May 1947 – 1 November 2020) was a Russian politician who was governor of Volgograd Oblast from 1997–2010. In 1996 he won
the election for governor. He won his last re-election in 2004, and left office at the end of 2009.

On 1 November 2020, Maksyuta died from COVID-19 in a Moscow hospital. His wife had also died from COVID-19 on 8 October 2020.

Family
Maksyuta was married. He had a son and daughter.

References

Governors of Volgograd Oblast
1947 births
2020 deaths
People from Kirovohrad Oblast
Deaths from the COVID-19 pandemic in Russia
Members of the Federation Council of Russia (after 2000)